The 17th United States Colored Infantry was an infantry regiment that served in the Union Army during the American Civil War. The regiment was composed of African American enlisted men commanded by white officers and was authorized by the Bureau of Colored Troops which was created by the United States War Department on May 22, 1863.

Service
The 17th U.S. Colored Infantry was organized in Nashville, Tennessee beginning December 12, 1863 and mustered in for three-year service under the command of Colonel William Rufus Shafter.

The regiment was attached to Post of Murfreesboro, Tennessee, Department of the Cumberland, to April 1864. Post and District of Nashville, Tennessee, Department of the Cumberland, to December 1864. 1st Colored Brigade, District of the Etowah, Department of the Cumberland, to January 1865. Post and District of Nashville, Tennessee, Department of the Cumberland, to April 1866.

The 17th U.S. Colored Infantry mustered out of service April 30, 1866.

Detailed service
Duty at McMinnville and Murfreesboro, Tenn., until November 1864. Battle of Nashville, Tenn., December 15–16. Overton Hill December 16. Pursuit of Hood to the Tennessee River December 17–27. Decatur December 28–30. Duty at Post of Nashville, Tenn., until April 1866.

Commanders
 Colonel William Rufus Shafter

See also

 List of United States Colored Troops Civil War Units
 United States Colored Troops

References
 Dyer, Frederick H. A Compendium of the War of the Rebellion (Des Moines, IA: Dyer Pub. Co.), 1908.
Attribution

United States Colored Troops Civil War units and formations
Military units and formations established in 1863
Military units and formations disestablished in 1866